Saint Nectarius of Auvergne (also known as Nectarius of St-Nectaire, Nectarius of Limagne, Necterius of Senneterre) is venerated as a 4th-century martyr and Christian missionary.

Life 
According to Gregory of Tours, Nectarius was one of the seven missionaries sent by Pope Fabian from Rome to Gaul to spread Christianity there. The other six were Gatianus of Tours, Trophimus of Arles, Paul of Narbonne, Martial of Limoges, Denis of Paris, and Saturninus of Toulouse.

Nectarius was accompanied by the priests Baudimius (Baudenius, Baudime) and Auditor (Auditeur); tradition states that they were all brothers. An alternate tradition states that Saint Peter rather than Pope Fabian sent Nectarius and his brothers to evangelize Gaul.

A third tradition states that Saint Austremonius ordered Nectarius to Christianize the plain of Limagne in the Massif Central. Nectarius turned a temple dedicated to Apollo on the hill known as Cornadore into a Christian church, which became the Basilica of Notre Dame du Mont Cornadore at Saint-Nectaire, at Puy-de-Dôme. Nectarius was subsequently killed by the local pagan leader, Bradulus.

Veneration
Evidence of veneration for Nectarius dates from the 10th century. A sepulcher at the Benedictine priory of St-Nectaire (corrupted into Sennecterre and Senneterre) became a center of pilgrimage. A borough arose around the priory, which became a center for mineral water and the manufacture of the cheese known as Saint-Nectaire.

Nectarius is the co-patron of Saint-Nectaire along with Saint Auditor, although Saint Auditor is the principal patron saint of that town, for reasons unknown.

References

4th-century Christian martyrs
Gallo-Roman saints
Year of birth unknown